This is a list of the results of all the Rio Carnival parades in 2016. In the Special Group will be considered only 35 notes, already that the Jurado Fabiano Rock that scarcely considered the metric battery would have a supposed friendship with the dual Zezé Di Camargo and Luciano. As a rule, the judges may not have relationships with the honorees.

Grupo Especial

Série A

Série B

Grupo C

Grupo D

Grupo E

See also 
 Results of the 2016 São Paulo Carnival

References 

2016
2016 in Brazilian carnival